This list of botanical gardens in Italy is intended to include all significant botanical gardens and arboretums in Italy.

 Abruzzo
 Alpine Botanical Garden of Campo Imperatore (Giardino Botanico Alpino di Campo Imperatore)
 Giardino Botanico Daniela Brescia
 Giardino Botanico della Majella
 Giardino Botanico e Arboreto Appenninico del Parco Nazionale d'Abruzzo
 Giardino Botanico Gole del Sagittario
 Giardino Botanico "Loreto Grande"
 Giardino Botanico Mediterraneo
 Giardino Botanico Michele Tenore, Colle Madonna
 Giardino dei Semplici, Chieti
 Orto Botanico dell'Università dell'Aquila
 Orto Botanico di Collemaggio
 Orto Botanico Riserva Lago di Penne
 Botanical Garden at the Sorgenti del Cavuto
 Apulia
 Orto Botanico dell'Università di Bari, at Via Orabona, Bari
 Orto Botanico dell'Università di Lecce, at Via Provinciale Lecce-Monteroni, Lecce
 Calabria
 Giardino Botanico Santicelli, at Soverato
 Orto Botanico dell'Università della Calabria, at Rende
 Campania
 Botanical Garden of Naples (Orto Botanico dell'Università di Napoli)
 L'Hortus Camaldulensis di Napoli
 Orto Botanico di Portici (Orto Botanico della Facoltà di Agraria dell'Università di Napoli-Portici)
 Giardini Ravino (succulents and cacti)
 Emilia-Romagna
 Civico Orto Botanico "Ulisse Aldrovandi",  S. Giovanni in Persiceto
 Giardino Botanico Alpino "Esperia", Sestola 
 Giardino Botanico del Museo Civico di Scienze Naturali di Faenza
 Giardino Botanico di Valbonella, Corniolo, Forlì
 Giardino dei Semplici, Bagnacavallo
 Giardino delle Erbe "A. Rinaldi Ceroni" (Giardino Officinale di Casola Valsenio)
 Orto Botanico dell'Università di Bologna
 Orto Botanico dell'Università di Ferrara
 Orto Botanico dell'Università di Modena e Reggio Emilia (Orto Botanico di Modena)
 Orto Botanico dell'Università di Parma (Orto Botanico di Parma)
 Friuli-Venezia Giulia
 Arboreto Pascul, Tarcento, Udine
 Civico Orto Botanico di Trieste (Botanical Garden of Trieste)
 Giardino Botanico Carsiana (Carsiana Botanical Garden), Sgonico, Trieste
 Orto Botanico dell'Università di Trieste
 Orto Botanico Friulano, Udine
 Parco Botanico Friulano "Cormor", Udine
 Lazio
 Giardini Botanici di Stigliano
 Giardino Botanico di Collepardo
 Giardino Botanico Ponziano, Ponza
 Giardino delle Orchidee Spontanee del Mediterraneo, Ladispoli
 Orto Botanico dell'Università della Tuscia
 Orto Botanico dell'Università di Roma "La Sapienza" (Orto Botanico di Roma)
 Orto Botanico dell'Università di Tor Vergata
 Liguria
 Giardini Botanici Hanbury, Ventimiglia
 Giardino botanico Clelia Durazzo Grimaldi, Pegli
 Giardino Botanico Montano di Pratorondanino, Campo Ligure
 Orto Botanico dell'Università di Genova
 Orto Botanico di Montemarcello
 Orto Botanico di Villa Beuca (Botanical Garden of Villa Beuca)
 Lombardy
 Giardino Botanico Alpino di Pietra Corva
 Giardino Botanico Alpino "Rezia", Bormio, Sondrio
 Giardino Botanico Fondazione André Heller, Gardone Riviera
 Giardino Botanico Intragnola, Lago Maggiore
 Giardino Botanico Polidora, Laveno Mombello
 Giardino Botanico Trebbo Trebbi
 Giardino Montano per la Conservazione della Biodiversità "Ruggero Tomaselli", Varese
 Orto Botanico dell'Università di Pavia
 Orto Botanico di Bergamo "Lorenzo Rota" 
 Orto Botanico di Brera, Milan
 Orto Botanico di Cascina Rosa, Milan
 Orto Botanico Didattico Sperimentale dell'Università di Milano, Milan
 Orto Botanico "G.E. Ghirardi", Toscolano Maderno
 Marche
 Arboretum Apenninicum, Camerino
 Giardino Botanico, Istituto Tecnico Agrario Statale "Celso Ulpiani", Ascoli Piceno
 Orto Botanico dell'Università di Camerino
 Orto Botanico dell'Università Politecnica delle Marche (Orto Botanico dell'Università di Ancona)
 Orto Botanico "Pierina Scaramella" (Orto Botanico dell'Università di Urbino)
 Molise
 Giardino di Flora Appenninica, Capracotta, Isernia
 Piedmont
 Giardini Botanici dell'Isola Madre, Stresa
 Giardini Botanici Villa Taranto, Pallanza, Verbania
 Giardino Botanico Alpinia, Stresa
 Giardino Botanico Alpino "Bruno Peyronel", Val Pellice, Torino
 Giardino Botanico Alpino Valderia
 Giardino Botanico di Oropa 
 Giardino Botanico Rea, Val Sangone, Torino
 Orto Botanico di Torino (Orto Botanico dell'Università di Torino)
 Sardinia
 Arboreto Mediterraneo del Limbara
 Giardino Montano Linasia
 Orto Botanico di Cagliari (Orto Botanico dell'Università di Cagliari)
 Orto Botanico dell'Università di Sassari
 Sicily
 Giardino Botanico "Nuova Gussonea", Ragalna
 Orto Botanico dell'Università di Catania
 Orto Botanico dell'Università di Messina
 Orto Botanico dell'Università di Palermo
 Tuscany
 Arboreti di Vallombrosa, Reggello, Firenze
 Giardino Botanico Tropicale dell'Istituto Agronomico per l'Oltremare, Firenze
 Giardino delle Rose
 Giardino dell'Iris, Firenze
 Giardino Montano dell' Orecchiella
 Museo e Arboreto Carlo Siemoni, Badia Prataglia, Arezzo
 Orto Botanico Comunale di Lucca
 Orto Botanico dei Frignoli, Fivizzano, Massa
 Orto Botanico del Mediterraneo, Livorno
 Orto Botanico dell'Università di Siena
 Orto Botanico di Firenze (Giardino dei Semplici)
 Orto Botanico di Pisa (Orto Botanico dell'Università di Pisa)
 Orto Botanico Forestale dell'Abetone 
 Orto Botanico "Pania di Corfino"
 Orto Botanico delle Alpi Apuane "Pietro Pellegrini", Pian della Fioba
 Orto dei Semplici Elbano
 Trentino-Alto Adige/Südtirol
 Arboreto di Arco
 Gardens of Trauttmansdorff Castle
 Giardino Botanico Alpino alle Viotte di Monte Bondone
 Giardino Botanico Alpino di Passo Coe
 Giardino Botanico Preistorico di Molina di Ledro
 Umbria
 Orto Botanico di Perugia (Orto Botanico dell'Università di Perugia)
 Aosta Valley
 Paradisia Alpine Botanical Garden
 Savoy Castle Alpine Botanical Garden
 Chanousia Alpine Botanical Garden
 Alpine Botanical Garden Saussurea
 Veneto
 Giardino Alpino "Antonio Segni", Taibon Agordino, Belluno
 Giardino Botanico Alpino "Giangio Lorenzoni", al Pian di Cansiglio
 Giardino Botanico Alpino San Marco, Valli del Pasubio
 Giardino Botanico della Scuola Media Statale "E.Toti" di Musile di Piave, Musile di Piave
 Giardino Botanico delle Alpi Orientali (Giardino Botanico di Monte Faverghera), Monte Faverghera
 Giardino Botanico Litoraneo di Porto Caleri (Giardino Botanico Litoraneo del Veneto), Rosolina
 Giardino Fenologico "Alessandro Marcello", Treviso
 Giardino Officinale di Marzana, Verona
 Orto Botanico Conservativo Carlo Spegazzini, Treviso
 Orto Botanico Conservativo Francesco Busnello, Treviso
 Orto Botanico del Monte Baldo, Ferrara di Monte Baldo
 Orto Botanico di Padova (Orto Botanico dell'Università di Padova)
 Orto Botanico Locatelli, Mestre

See also

 Botanical garden
 List of botanical gardens
 History of gardening

External links 
 Convention on Biological Diversity - Italian Botanical Gardens
 List of botanical gardens in Italy
 The official site of the botanical garden Intragnola, Lake Maggiore, Italy

 
Botanical gardens
Italy
Botanical gardens